This is a list of episodes for the CBS comedy television series Yes, Dear. A total of 122 episodes ran over six seasons, from October 2, 2000 to February 15, 2006.

Series overview

Episodes

Season 1 (2000–01)

Season 2 (2001–02)

Season 3 (2002–03)

Season 4 (2003–04)

Season 5 (2005)

Season 6 (2005–06)

References

Yes, Dear